Basie Jam 3 is a 1976 studio album by Count Basie, produced at the same sessions as Basie Jam 2.

Track listing 
 "Bye Bye Blues" (David Bennett, Chauncey Gray, Frederick Hamm, Bert Lown) – 9:42
 "Moten Swing" (Bennie Moten, Buster Moten) – 9:48
 "I Surrender Dear" (Harry Barris, Gordon Clifford) – 6:48
 "Song of the Islands" (Charles E. King) – 9:55

Personnel 
 Count Basie - piano
 Benny Carter - alto saxophone
 Eddie "Lockjaw" Davis - tenor saxophone
 Al Grey - trombone
 Clark Terry - trumpet
 Joe Pass - guitar
 John Heard - double bass
 Louie Bellson - drums

References 

1976 albums
Count Basie albums
Pablo Records albums
Albums produced by Norman Granz